Awdry is a surname. Notable people with the surname include:

Charles Awdry (1906–1965), English cricketer, British Army officer, High Sheriff of Wiltshire
Christopher Awdry (born 1940), English author, son of the Rev. W. Awdry
Daniel Awdry (1924–2008), British politician
John Wither Awdry (1795–1878), English judge, Chief Justice of the Bombay Supreme Court
Robert Awdry (1881–1949), English cricketer, British Army officer, High Sheriff of Wiltshire
Wilbert Awdry (1911–1997), English cleric and author, creator of The Railway Series
William Awdry (1842–1910), Anglican clergyman, Bishop of Southampton, Osaka and South Tokyo

See also
Awdry Vaucour (1890–1918), British First World War flying ace